The narrow-mouthed toad is a genus of microhylid frogs found in the Americas between Honduras and the southern United States.

Narrow-mouthed toad may also refer to:

 Butler's narrow-mouthed toad, a frog found in India, Myanmar, China, Hong Kong, Taiwan, Thailand, Cambodia, Laos, Vietnam, Malaysia, and Singapore
 Mexican narrow-mouthed toad, a frog native to North America
 Mount Elimbari narrow-mouthed toad, a frog endemic to Papua New Guinea
 Ornate narrow-mouthed toad, a frog found in South Asia
 Stejneger's narrow-mouthed toad, a frog endemic to Taiwan
 Two-spaded narrow-mouthed toad, a frog found in El Salvador, Guatemala, and Mexico

See also

 Narrowmouth toad (disambiguation)

Animal common name disambiguation pages